Selviytyjät Suomi 2018 is the second season of the Finnish version of Survivor which is based on the Swedish reality television show Expedition Robinson. This is the first season to air since 2013 and the first to air on the television channel Nelonen after they had hosted the previous version of Suomen Robinson back in 2005. This season consists of 16 contestants who are famous for various reasons who are put into two tribes of eight, trying to last out everyone else to win €30,000. The season aired from 3 February to 13 May 2018 where businessman and reality personal Sampo Kaulanen won in a 6-1 jury vote over fitness competitor Janni Hussi.

Finishing order

Challenges

Voting history

References

External links

Survivor Finland seasons
Finnish reality television series
2018 Finnish television seasons
Television shows filmed in the Philippines